Aluminium-manganese alloys (AlMn alloys) are aluminium alloys that contain manganese (Mn) as the main alloy element. They consist mainly of aluminium (Al); in addition to manganese, which accounts for the largest proportion of about 1% of the alloying elements, iron (Fe), silicon (Si), magnesium (Mg) or copper (Cu) may also be contained. AlMn is almost only used as a wrought alloy and is processed into sheets or profiles by rolling or extrusion presses. The alloys are corrosion-resistant, have low strengths for aluminium alloys and are not hardenable (by heat treatment). They are standardised in the 3000 series.

Applications 
Aluminium manganese alloys are used for applications with low demands on strength and are also applicable in chemical and food-related environments due to their corrosion resistance. AlMn is therefore not a construction material but a functional material.

AlMn is processed into beverage cans and is generally referred to as the packaging material used. It is used for apparatus and pipes in the chemical industry for roof cladding, wall coverings, pressure vessels, roller shutters, roller doors and heat exchangers.

Influences of the alloy elements 
Manganese combines with aluminium to form intermetallic phases and thus increases strength. Each percent of manganese increases the strength by about 42 MPa. Iron and silicon are usually unwanted accompanying elements that cannot be completely removed. Magnesium and copper increase strength better (70-85 MPa per % Mg) and are added to increase strength.

Phases

Binary aluminium manganese phases 
Aluminium and manganese are partially miscible in the solid state. In addition, they form various intermetallic phases.

The eutectic between aluminium and Al 6 Mn is 1.3% Mn and 660 °C, while pure aluminium melts at 660.2 °C. Values ​​of 1.8% and 657 °C or 658 °C can also be found in older literature.

Above 710 °C, Al4Mn is formed with an Mn content of at least 4%. However, such high levels are not technically used. Below 510 °C or 511 °C, Al12Mn forms .

The solubility of manganese in the aluminum solid solution falls rapidly with decreasing temperature and is close to zero at room temperature.

Phases in AlMn materials with other elements 
Some of the AlMn materials also contain iron (Fe) or silicon (Si) additives. These form the phases Al3Fe, Al8Fe2Si, Al5FeSi, Al15Si2(Mn,Fe)3. Mixed crystals also occur in the form of Al12(Mn,Fe)3Si. 

 Aluminum and Al15Si2(Mn,Fe)3 are formed from the melt, Al3Fe and Al6(Mn,Fe) at 648 °C
 At temperatures below 630 °C, aluminum, Al15Si2(Mn,Fe)3 and Al 8Fe2Si are formed from the melt, Al3Fe
 Aluminum, Al5FeSi and Al15Si2(Mn,Fe)3 are formed from the melt and Al8Fe2Si at around 600 °C
 Aluminum, silicon and Al15Si2(Mn,Fe)3 are formed from the melt and Al5FeSi at around 565 °C

Structures 
The Structure according to the casting into bars or slabs consists of the main mass of an oversaturated-Mixed crystal and excreted areas with manganese-containing phases whose size is about 100 μm. A large part of the manganese (about 0.7 to 0.9%) is still dissolved in aluminium, as the cooling speeds after casting are too large for all manganese to be passed through diffusion could excrete. The reason for this is also the very low diffusion speed of manganese in aluminium.

Through homogenization and forming (rolling, forging) the structure changes. Various phases are eliminated from the aluminum basic structure, the size of which is less than one micron. These particles cause an increase in strength against pure aluminium by about 25%. They are thermally stable, and difficult to dissolve. In the formed and homogenized state, there is a very fine structure, and the larger, manganese-containing areas from the casting state are no longer present. These finely distributed particles also hinder grain growth and thus improve the strength of the material; however, this improvement is only small, as it generally depends little on the grain size for aluminium materials.

The presence of silicon accelerates the excretion of Al12(Mn,Fe)3Si. If there is enough silicon, the Al6(Mn,Fe) is converted to Al12(Mn,Fe)3Si during homogenisation.

Properties and standardised alloys

3000 series 
3000 series are alloyed with manganese, and can be work hardened.

References

Further reading 

 Friedrich Ostermann: Application technology aluminium. 3. Edition. Springer, 2014, ISBN 978-3-662-43806-0, p. 100-102.
 Aluminium paperback. Volume 1: Fundamentals and materials. 16. Edition. Beuth-Verlag, Berlin/ Vienna/ Zurich 2002,ISBN 3-87017-274-6, p. 104 f, 122.
 George E. Totten, D. Scott MacKenzie: Handbook of Aluminum. Volume 1: Physical Metallurgy and Processes. Marcel Dekker, New York/ Basel 2003, ISBN 0-8247-0494-0, p. 159f.

Aluminium–manganese alloys